Luca Rastelli (born 29 December 1999) is an Italian racing cyclist, who currently rides for UCI ProTeam .

Major results
2017
 2nd  Road race, UCI Junior Road World Championships
 2nd Trofeo Citta di Loano
 3rd Time trial, National Junior Road Championships
 6th Trofeo Buffoni
 8th Trofeo Emilio Paganessi
 9th Montichiari–Roncone
2018
 7th Gran Premio Industrie del Marmo
2019
 2nd Coppa della Pace
 5th Visegrad 4 Kerékpárverseny
 10th Ruota d'Oro

Grand Tour general classification results timeline

References

External links

1999 births
Living people
Italian male cyclists
Cyclists from Cremona